Mohamed Mamdouh may refer to:
 Mohamed Mamdouh (handballer) (born 1989), Egyptian handball player.
 Mohamed Mamdouh (swimmer) (born 1985), Egyptian swimmer. 
 Mohamed Mamdouh (footballer) (born 1993), Egyptian footballer.